Elena Lev, born in Moscow, Russia on December 1st 1981, began her training to become a rhythmic gymnast at an early age, assisted and coached by her mother, Elena Lev Sr. She developed a signature hula hoop act incorporating gymnastics and contortion. Her big breakthrough came when she was invited to join the Alegría touring troupe of Cirque du Soleil, of which she was a member from 1994 through 2000. She also performed briefly with the Quidam troupe in 2002. Lev performed with Cirque du Soleil's Wintuk at the WaMu Theater at Madison Square Garden in New York City.

Lev is currently performing in Cirque Du Soleil's Zumanity in Las Vegas. She is also in management and about to graduate with a degree in Food and Beverage Management. Her daughter Varvara, who is almost 12, is in synchronised swimming and training to follow in her mother's footsteps but in a different field.

References

External links
 Elena Lev - Hoopsact.com
 
 Interview

Cirque du Soleil performers
Living people
1981 births